The Nen language, Tunen (Banen), is a Bantu language of Cameroon. Maho (2009) considers Aling'a to be a distinct language. Unlike all other Bantu languages, Nen has an SOV word order rather than the standard Bantu SVO word order.

References

Mbam languages
Languages of Cameroon
Articles citing ISO change requests